The Honda CB250RS is a 250 cc motorcycle designed for road use.  It was produced until the mid-1980s. It has a high-compression four-stroke, four-valve, air-cooled, single-cylinder engine, which was an upgrade of the engine built for the earlier XL250S trail bike. The RS is known for its slim build, with a dry weight of only 128 kg, and nimble handling. The engine featured counter rotating balancers, which reduced vibration and allowed a lighter frame. Further weight savings were achieved by making the engine a stressed component. Early models were kick-started (with an automatic decompression lever), while later Deluxe models (designated RS-D / RSZ) came with electric start and different paintwork. The bike has a front disc brake and rear drum brake, and while it had only a single-cylinder, it had twin exhausts;  one for each port.

The engine generates modest power and achieves a top speed of around 136 km/h or 84 mph. Early models produced a claimed 26 hp, while later models claimed 33 hp. It claimed fuel efficiency of up to 70 mpg (3.4 L/100 km).  Known issues include failed ignition coils and CDIs. Lack of battery cranking power can be an issue with the RS-D if an inadequate replacement battery is fitted.

CB250